Vișinești is a commune in Dâmbovița County, Muntenia, Romania with a population of 1,974 people. It is composed of four villages: Dospinești, Sultanu, Urseiu, and Vișinești.

The commune is located in the northeastern part of the county, on the border with Prahova County.

References

Communes in Dâmbovița County
Localities in Muntenia